"Ballerina" is the second to last song on Astral Weeks, the 1968 album by Northern Irish singer-songwriter Van Morrison.

Recording and composition
"Ballerina" was recorded during the last Astral Weeks session on October 15, 1968, at Century Sound Studios in New York City.  Lewis Merenstein was the producer.

Morrison wrote "Ballerina" upon first meeting his future wife, Janet (an actress and model), when touring the U.S. with his band Them in June 1966. Them guitarist Jim Armstrong remembers rehearsing and playing the song for the first time at the Waikiki Shell in Hawaii.

Morrison commented to Ritchie Yorke about his inspiration for the song: "I was in San Francisco one time in 1966 and I was attracted to the city.  It was the first time I had been there, and I was sitting in this hotel and all these things were going through my head, and I had a flash about an actress in an opera house appearing in a ballet, and I think that's where the song came from." (Them played The Fillmore in San Francisco on June 23, 1966.)

The song has a simple chord pattern, but Morrison was able to make it sound like a mini-drama by altering the dynamics of his voice in the seven-minute song. Writer Brian Hinton says of the recording: "If anyone ever argues that Morrison cannot sing — an unlikely scenario anyway — then simply play them this. All human emotion is crystallised here, and subtly vocalised: desire, joy, hope, world weariness, consolation, awe and anticipation."

Other releases
"Ballerina" is one of the songs performed on the 1980 Montreux concert that is featured on the 2 disc DVD, Live at Montreux 1980/1974 that Morrison released in 2006. This song was also featured as a live performance on Morrison's 2009 album Astral Weeks Live at the Hollywood Bowl, recorded forty years after the classic album  Astral Weeks was first released.  In this performance, Morrison added to the ending of the song and entitled the new addition: "Move on Up".

Covers
Gov't Mule released a cover version of "Ballerina"  on their 2005 EP  Mo' Voodoo. Duke Special performed a live version of "Ballerina" with the Inishowen Gospel Choir.

Personnel
Van Morrison – vocals, acoustic guitar
Jay Berliner – acoustic guitar
Richard Davis – double bass
Connie Kay – drums
John Payne – flute
Warren Smith, Jr. – vibraphone
Larry Fallon – string and horn arrangements

Notes

References
Heylin, Clinton (2003). Can You Feel the Silence? Van Morrison: A New Biography, Chicago Review Press, 
Hinton, Brian (1997). Celtic Crossroads: The Art of Van Morrison, Sanctuary, 
Turner, Steve (1993). Van Morrison: Too Late to Stop Now, Viking Penguin, 
Yorke, Ritchie (1975). Into The Music, London: Charisma Books, 

1968 songs
Van Morrison songs
Songs written by Van Morrison
Song recordings produced by Lewis Merenstein